Holger Mann (born 19 February 1979) is a German politician of the Social Democratic Party (SPD) who has been serving as a member of the Bundestag since 2021.

Early life and education
Mann was born 1979 in the East German city of Dresden and studied history. He moved to Leipzig in 1997.

Political career

Career in state politics
Mann was member of the State Parliament of Saxony from 2009 to 2021.

Member of the German Parliament, 2021–present
In the 2021 elections, Mann was elected directly to the Bundestag, representing the Leipzig I district. In parliament, he has since been serving on the Committee on Education, Research and Technology Assessment.

Within his parliamentary group, Mann belongs to the Parliamentary Left, a left-wing movement.

Other activities
 Federal Agency for Disruptive Innovation (SPRIN-D), Member of the Supervisory Board (since 2022)
 Stiftung Forum Recht, Member of the Board of Trustees (since 2022)
 German United Services Trade Union (ver.di), Member

References 

Living people
1979 births
People from Dresden
Social Democratic Party of Germany politicians
21st-century German politicians
Members of the Bundestag 2021–2025